This is a list of European routes, or E-roads, that run through Russia. The current network is signposted according to the 1992 system revision, and contains 21 class A routes and four class B routes within the country. Most routes also carry the federal M, R, and A motorway designations, but a few also carry regional road designations.

Class-A European routes

Class-B European routes

References

See also 

 
Russia
European